Zvole is a municipality and village in Žďár nad Sázavou District in the Vysočina Region of the Czech Republic. It has about 700 inhabitants.

Administrative parts
Villages of Branišov and Olešínky are administrative parts of Zvole.

References

Villages in Žďár nad Sázavou District